Richard Clyfton (Clifton) (died 1616) was an English Brownist minister, at Scrooby, Nottinghamshire, and then in Amsterdam.

Life
He is identified with the Richard Clifton who, on 12 February 1585, was instituted to the vicarage of Marnham, near Newark, and on 11 July 1586 to the rectory of All Saints' Church, Babworth, near Retford, and not very far from Scrooby. The separatist church in Nottinghamshire, which was probably Clyfton's church, ordinarily met in William Brewster's house at Scrooby.

John Robinson attached himself to Clyfton's church, and was shortly afterwards chosen his assistant in the ministry; and after Clyfton's move to the Netherlands became sole pastor of the church. William Bradford belonged to this congregation. Bradford had first encountered Clifton when he was in Scrooby.

Clifton emigrated to Amsterdam in August 1608. He joined other exiles there, and attached himself to the church of which Francis Johnson was pastor. He was, perhaps, on Henry Ainsworth's departure (16 December 1610) made teacher among them. William Bradford describes him as a "grave and fatherly old man when he left England, having a great white beard".

Clifton died at Amsterdam on 20 May 1616, and is buried in the Zuiderkerk.

He was also a member and leader of the pilgrims. He led a congregation with William Brewster.Separatist pastor of Babworth's All Saints' Paris Church, England. Under his teaching, the Pilgrim movement began which would culminate in the sailing of the Pilgrims to America on the Mayflower. Pastor of young William Bradford. Clyfton was one of the most effective authors for the Pilgrim Separatists. The church where he is buried has been deconsecrated and is now used by the city of Amsterdam as an exposition center.The English Separatist congregation that became the core of the Pilgrim movement had two pastors. 
Neither saw the "promised land" of Plymouth Colony.
The second pastor, John Robinson, was with the congregation (although not yet pastor) when they 
moved from England to Holland in search of religious freedom. He was a strong proponent of the 
group's later move from Holland to America, where they would reestablish their church in the new 
Plymouth Colony. When it was determined that only a minority of his congregation would voyage on 
the Mayflower, however, Robinson remained behind in Holland. He intended to make the Atlantic 
crossing with the rest of his flock as soon as it was financially possible. It was not to be. Robinson 
died in 1624 in Leiden, never having seen Plymouth Colony.
John Robinson did, however, rejoice from afar in the founding of Plymouth. And, even though they 
were separated by the Atlantic Ocean, Robinson in Leiden and that portion of his flock that had 
emigrated to Plymouth remained connected. The colonists continued to regard Robinson as their 
spiritual leader. His advice was sought - and received - by letter. Robinson's wisdom and flexibility, 
as reflected in the character of early Plymouth Colony, are widely regarded as significant elements in 
the Colony's survival.
Robinson's predecessor as pastor of the Pilgrim group is often overlooked. John Robinson was not, 
in fact, the founder of the original congregation. Instead, he joined a congregation that was already 
gathered around Richard Clyfton.
William Bradford describes how the Separatists in the area of England known today as "Pilgrim 
Country" (Nottinghamshire, Lincolnshire and Yorkshire) formed themselves into two distinct 
churches. One was the church gathered at Gainsborough in Lincolnshire (John Smyth became their 
pastor). The other was the church gathered first at Babworth and then at Scrooby in 
Nottinghamshire, about ten miles from Gainsborough. This Babworth/Scrooby congregation (which 
would eventually become the Pilgrim church) was under the leadership of Richard Clyfton. 
"In one of these churches [Gainsborough]… was Mr. John Smith, a man of able gifts and a 
good preacher, who afterwards was chosen their pastor. But these afterwards falling into 
some errors in the Low Countries [The Netherlands], there (for the most part) buried 
themselves and their names. But in this other church [Babworth/Scrooby]…besides other 
worthy men, was Mr. Richard Clyfton, a grave and reverend preacher, who by his pains and 
diligence had done much good, and under God had been a means of the conversion of 
many. And also that famous and worthy man Mr. John Robinson, who afterwards was their 
pastor for many years, till the Lord took him away by death. Also Mr. William Brewster…"
It was the preaching of Richard Clyfton and the inspiration he provided to William Brewster and 
William Bradford that launched the "Pilgrim adventure."
Richard Clyfton was born around 1553 near the Nottinghamshire village of Babworth but left to 
attend Cambridge University, a hotbed of dissenting theology. He returned home an ordained 
minister in 1586 and was named pastor of Babworth’s All Saints Church. His position as pastor provided Clyfton with a "living" and he was now able to marry. He and his wife Anne had three sons 
and three daughters, all born at Babworth. The three daughters died in infancy or childhood, but the 
three Clyfton sons survived.
Sometime in the 1590s, Clyfton began to preach dissenting religious views and to conduct services 
using prayers that were not in the officially authorized Book of Prayers. He soon drew an audience 
from the surrounding towns and villages. William Brewster, living six or seven miles away in 
Scrooby, heard Clyfton preach. Brewster joined Clyfton's Babworth congregation, walking by paths 
through the fields to attend services every Sunday morning and returning by foot to Scrooby late 
every Sunday afternoon. Several years later, around 1602, young William Bradford, who was living 
in Austerfield (a Yorkshire village some ten miles from Babworth), also, according to Cotton Mather 
"came to enjoy Mr. Richard Clifton's illuminating ministry." The path from William Bradford’s home in 
Austerfield to Richard Clyfton’s church in Babworth went by William Brewster’s home in Scrooby. 
The two men - Bradford a lonely and intellectual teenager and Brewster a settled older family man -
walked together and undoubtedly learned each other's minds and characters. -By Grizzell

Works
At Amsterdam Clyfton was engaged in several bitter controversies. Having renounced the principles of rigid separation he became one of the most violent adversaries of John Smyth, and published, A Plea for Infants and elder People concerning their Baptisme. Or a Processe of the Passages between M. Iohn Smyth and Richard Clifton, Amsterdam, 1610. He also wrote An Advertisement concerning a book lately published by Christopher Lawne and others, against the Exiled English Church at Amsterdam, 1612. The book attacked is The prophane Schism of the Brownists or Separatists, with the impiety, dissensions, lewd and abominable vices of that impure Sect, discovered, 1612. Henry Ainsworth published An Animadversion to Mr. Richard Clyftons Advertisement, Amsterdam, 1613.

Notes

References

External links
 The Story of the Pilgrim Fathers, 1606-1623 A. D. by Edward Arber. Published by Ward and Downey, 1897

16th-century births
1616 deaths
English separatists
16th-century English Puritan ministers
English Jacobean nonconforming clergy
People from Scrooby
Year of birth unknown